Girl Scouts is a term used alternately with Girl Guides to refer to female members of a scouting organization. 

Girl Scouts may also refer to:

Girl Scouts of the USA, the United States organization founded by Juliette Gordon Low

There are thousands of national Scouting and Guiding organizations or federations; these are grouped into six international Scouting or Guiding associations with some non-aligned organizations:

 Confédération Européenne de Scoutisme 
 Order of World Scouts
 International Union of Guides and Scouts of Europe
 World Federation of Independent Scouts
 World Association of Girl Guides and Girl Scouts
 List of World Association of Girl Guides and Girl Scouts members
 World Organization of the Scout Movement
 List of World Organization of the Scout Movement members
 List of non-aligned Scouting organizations

Other uses
 Girl Scout (film), a 2008 South Korean film
 "Girl Scout", a song from the stage musical Beetlejuice
 "Girlscout", a song by Jack Off Jill from the 1997 album Sexless Demons and Scars

See also